KZFN (106.1 FM, "ZFun 106") is a radio station based in Moscow, Idaho. KZFN launched in August 1985 and serves Moscow, Pullman, Washington, and the Lewiston–Clarkston metropolitan area.

The transmitter and tower, located on Paradise Ridge (just south of Moscow), provides coverage to the north, west, and south. It has an effective radiated power of 63,000 watts and covers the Palouse listening area, centered in Moscow and nearby Pullman, Washington. To the east, the broadcast signal is limited by the Bitterroot mountain range. Until early 2008, KZFN was also carried on K237DP-FM 95.3 FM, a 34-watt broadcast translator in the "Tri-Cities" of Richland, Pasco, and Kennewick. The simulcast of the station ended due to the sale of the translator.

ZFun 106 is a Mainstream Top 40 CHR station. It plays both original programs such as the "Rude Awakening" morning show, hosted by Steve Shannon, as well as syndicated programs including the Sticky Mix with DJ Sticky Boots, American Top 40 with Ryan Seacrest, Sunday Night Slow Jams with R Dub, and Matt Mony's "Kickback On-Air." The station caters mainly to persons 18–34 years of age, primarily the Washington State University and University of Idaho student populations.

References

External links
 
 
 
 

ZFN
Contemporary hit radio stations in the United States
Mass media in Moscow, Idaho